Snow is the fourth studio album by American indie rock band The New Year. Released on April 28, 2017 through the Undertow Music Collective, it is the first album released by the group since their 2008 self-titled album. It is also the first full-length work by the group to not be issued through Touch & Go Records.

Track listing

Personnel
Matt Kadane - guitar, keyboards, vocals, recording, production
Bubba Kadane - guitar, vocals, recording, production
Mike Donofrio - bass
Chris Brokaw - drums
Steve Albini - recording
Matthew Barnhart - recording, mastering
Nicolò Sertorio - photography

References

External links
 Snow on Bandcamp
 

2017 albums
The New Year albums